Everyone to La Moneda (in Spanish: Todos a La Moneda, stylized Todxs a La Moneda or Tod@s a La Moneda) is a political movement created in 2013 to support independent candidate for president of Chile Marcel Claude. Todxs a La Moneda is composed by Izquierda Unida and the Humanist Party of Chile, for the presidential election of 17 November 2013.

The coalition is participating as an electoral pact in the regional advisors election of 2013, although, in the parliamentary election, the Humanist Party is appearing as a unique list, as only pacts with two or more legally constituted parties are accepted. As a consequence, several members of the movement, including Claude, adhered Todxs a La Moneda in an instrumental way.

Goals
Todxs a La Moneda aims to "create a free society", which is the main focus (or axis) of Marcel Claude's presidential candidacy. Eight more goals have been proposed by the humanists and Claude, which are "essential to the Chilean society": "political constitution and democracy; deconcentration and decentralization of the State; diversity, human rights, discriminated majorities; native people; economic development: economy, work, productive development and social security; social politics: health, education, cultural development, housing; foreign policy and towards Latin America; environment and energy."

Organization

References

External links
 Marcel 2014

Defunct left-wing political party alliances
Defunct political party alliances in Chile
2013 establishments in Chile